Weald is a hamlet in Bampton civil parish in Oxfordshire, England. The toponym Weald is from the Old English for "woodland". The place was recorded by name in the late 12th century when Osney Abbey acquired a house there. It was a separate township by the 13th century. In the 18th and 19th centuries the township included much of the southwest part of the town of Bampton itself. A large late 17th century manor house, Weald Manor, was remodelled at around 1730. It is a Grade II* listed building.

References

Sources

Villages in Oxfordshire
West Oxfordshire District